A snuff spoon is a tiny spoon used for nasal insufflation of powdered substances. In the ancient time the spoons were used to ingest psychotropic substances, in the 18th century − tobacco, in the 20th century − cocaine (the spoon is thus also known as a cocaine spoon or coke spoon). Some local statutes in the US treat this spoon as drug paraphernalia, defining it as a spoon that is too small and thus "unsuited for the typical, lawful uses of a spoon".

These spoons are so small that they are frequently mistaken for the toy ones. The designs of the snuff spoons closely followed that of the larger ones, and thus can be used to date the étuis containing them

History 

Snuff spoons have a very long history. Archeologists found them, for example, at Chavín de Huántar site in Peru (presumably used for consumption of psychoactive preparations of Anadenanthera colubrina more than 2000 years ago), as well as in South Africa, where a combination of a tiny comb and a little spoon had made some researchers to assume that the spoon was used as an earpick or head-scratcher.   

In England, powdered snuff appeared at the end of the 17th century, and quickly became popular along with the devices for its consumption. The combination of a little vial and a snuff spoon that acted like a stopper was a precursor of the snuff-box. By the end of the 19th century the snuff spoons went completely out of use.

In the US, McDonald's provides straight swizzle sticks to stir the coffee, while in the rest of the world a small plastic stirring spoon is used. According to Graybosch, this is due to the 1960s rumor that the spoons can be used to snort cocaine.

In popular culture
 Youngblood Priest, the protagonist of the 1972 film Super Fly, is depicted as wearing a coke spoon necklace.

References

Sources
 
 
 
 
 
 
 
Cocaine
Drug paraphernalia
Tobacco accessories
Spoons